Empire Jean was the name of two tugs built by Clelands (Successors) Ltd, Willington Quay-on-Tyne, England.

, launched in October 1944
, launched in December 1944

Ship names